A distributed Bragg reflector (DBR) is a reflector used in waveguides, such as optical fibers. It is a structure formed from multiple layers of alternating materials with varying refractive index, or by periodic variation of some characteristic (such as height) of a dielectric waveguide, resulting in periodic variation in the effective refractive index in the guide. Each layer boundary causes a partial reflection of an optical wave. For waves whose vacuum wavelength is close to four times the optical thickness of the layers, the many reflections combine with constructive interference, and the layers act as a high-quality reflector.  The range of wavelengths that are reflected is called the photonic stopband. Within this range of wavelengths, light is "forbidden" to propagate in the structure.

Reflectivity

The DBR's reflectivity, for intensity is approximately given by 

The frequency bandwidth  of the photonic stopband can be calculated by

where  is the central frequency of the band.  This configuration gives the largest possible ratio  that can be achieved with these two values of the refractive index.

Increasing the number of pairs in a DBR increases the mirror reflectivity and increasing the refractive index contrast between the materials in the Bragg pairs increases both the reflectivity and the bandwidth.  A common choice of materials for the stack is titanium dioxide (n ≈ 2.5) and silica (n ≈ 1.5). Substituting into the formula above gives a bandwidth of about 200 nm for 630 nm light.

Distributed Bragg reflectors are critical components in vertical cavity surface emitting lasers and other types of narrow-linewidth laser diodes such as distributed feedback (DFB) lasers and distributed bragg reflector (DBR) lasers. They are also used to form the cavity resonator (or optical cavity) in fiber lasers and free electron lasers.

TE and TM mode reflectivity 

This section discusses the interaction of transverse electric (TE)
and transverse magnetic (TM) polarized light with the DBR structure, over several
wavelengths and incidence angles. This reflectivity of the DBR structure (described below)
was calculated using the transfer-matrix method (TMM), where
the TE mode alone is highly reflected by this stack, while the TM modes are passed 
through. This also shows the DBR acting as a polarizer.

For TE and TM incidence we have the reflection spectra of a DBR stack, corresponding
to a 6 layer stack of dielectric contrast of 11.5, between an air and dielectric layers.
The thicknesses of the air and dielectric layers are 0.8 and 0.2 of the period, respectively.
The wavelength in the figures below, corresponds to multiples of the cell period.

This DBR is also a simple example of a 1D photonic crystal.  It has a complete TE band gap, but only a pseudo TM band gap.

Bio-inspired Bragg Reflectors

Bio-inspired Bragg Reflectors are 1D photonic crystals inspired by nature. Reflection of light from such a nanostructured matter results in structural colouration. When designed from mesoporous metal-oxides or polymers, these devices can be used as  low-cost vapor/solvents sensors. For example, colour of this porous multi-layered structures will change when the matter filling up the pores is substituted by another, e.g. substituting air with water.

See also

References

Optical devices
Fiber optics